The City Wall of Suzhou is the city wall surrounding Suzhou city. The length of the wall was 15,204 metres before 1958. The majority of the wall was demolished in 1958. The length of the remaining wall is only 2,072 metres.

The construction of Suzhou city wall dates back to 514 BC. The present structure of the wall was built in 1662.

See also
Pan Gate

References

Buildings and structures in Suzhou
City walls in China
Tourist attractions in Suzhou